Bryan Okwara also known as Ikenna Bryan Okwara  (born 9 November 1985) is a Nigerian actor of Igbo descent and pageant contestant who won the title of Mr. Nigeria in 2007 and reached the semi-finals in the Mister World 2007 competition.

Filmography 

 If i am president 2018
 The Washerman 2018
 Crazy People 2018
 Entreat 2016
 The MatchMaker 2015
 Beauty of the Mind 2014
 The Awakening 2013
 Weekend Getaway 2012

References

External links

Igbo male models
Igbo male actors
Nigerian male film actors
Nigerian male models
Living people
1986 births
Nigerian beauty pageant winners
Nigerian beauty pageant contestants
Actors from Imo State
20th-century births